David Hittner (born July 10, 1939) is a senior United States District Judge on the United States District Court for the Southern District of Texas. He also has served by temporary assignment on the U.S. Court of Appeals for the 5th Circuit, as well as the U.S. District Courts for the Southern District of New York and the District of Arizona. His tenure as a federal jurist began in 1986, when he was nominated for the lifetime position by President Ronald Reagan and unanimously confirmed by the U.S. Senate.  Prior to his appointment to the federal bench in 1986, Hittner served from 1978 to 1986 as the elected judge of the 133rd Judicial District Court of Harris County, Texas, based in Houston.

Early life

Hittner was born in Schenectady, New York, but moved with his family to Brooklyn, New York when he was a year old. His father, J. George Hittner, was an electrician and a member of the Masons fraternal service organization. His mother, Sophie Moskowitz Hittner, was a bookkeeper and homemaker. Hittner was a Boy Scout, earning 81 merit badges and attaining Eagle Scout rank. He followed his hometown team, the Brooklyn Dodgers, and met his childhood hero,  Jackie Robinson, the first African-American to play major league baseball.

Education, military service and early career

Hittner received his undergraduate and law degrees from New York University. He passed the New York bar exam, and served two years in the Army as an infantry captain and paratrooper. Hittner then moved to Houston to pursue his legal career.

After passing the Texas bar, Hittner joined a private firm, gaining expertise in litigation and courtroom procedure. Hittner also developed an interest in family law and in 1975 was among the first class of Texas lawyers certified as family law specialists.

State court service 
Hittner twice campaigned for election to judgeships in Harris County's Courts of Domestic Relations. Those races were unsuccessful, but in 1978 Democratic Texas Governor Dolph Briscoe appointed Hittner to the 133rd Judicial District Court of Harris County. He subsequently won election twice, serving until 1986.

Federal court service 
On April 22, 1986, President Reagan nominated Hittner to succeed Judge George Edward Cire  on the United States District Court for the Southern District of Texas.  Hittner was confirmed by the Senate on June 6, 1986, and received his commission on June 9, 1986. He assumed senior status on November 11, 2004, but maintained a full-time caseload. In addition to his regular duties as a state and then a federal judge, Hittner became an expert in summary judgments, a teacher and a mentor. From 1981 until 2007, he conducted a continuing legal education program for state and federal court practitioners entitled "Saturday Morning in Court," with the focus on the critical minutiae of trial practice. The program prompted a laudatory note from then-Chief Justice Warren Burger, who recalled overseeing a similar project early in his legal career. Hittner is an adjunct professor at South Texas College of Law Houston.

Notable cases

Racial Gerrymandering: Hittner was a member of a three-judge panel that held three of Texas' 30 Congressional districts, as drawn by the state legislature in 1990, were unconstitutional. They were drawn based on racial minority populations in an effort to influence election results. The panel's decision was twice affirmed by the U.S. Supreme Court.

The Sleeping Lawyer. In 1995, Hittner blocked the execution of death row inmate Calvin Burdine and ordered a new trial. Burdine's court-appointed counsel in state court had dozed off during significant parts of the proceedings. Hittner's decision was affirmed by the U.S. Court of Appeals for the 5th Circuit, and the U.S. Supreme Court declined to review the decision further.

Houston City Hall Bribery Trials, 1998–99. The jury deadlocked in the first trial, involving two city councilmen, two former city councilmen, a former port commissioner and a lobbyist. The second trial focused on one of the former city councilmen and the former port commissioner; both served prison terms after they were convicted of bribery and conspiracy. The third trial for the two city councilmen and the remaining former city councilman—charges against the lobbyist had been dismissed—also ended in a hung jury and mistrial. Prosecutors declined to try the case again.

Cross Burning. In 2001, Hittner sentenced a young man to 10 years in federal prison for leading a group that burned a cross in the front yard of an African-American family in the Houston suburb of Katy.

Enron. In 2004, Hittner presided over criminal proceedings against former Enron assistant treasurer Lea Weingarten Fastow, the wife of Enron executive Andrew Fastow. She eventually pleaded guilty to filing a false federal tax return and served one year in federal prison.

Financial Fraud. Hittner sentenced R. Allen Stanford to a total of 110 years in federal prison for orchestrating a 20-year investment fraud scheme. Stanford, the former chairman of Stanford International Bank, was found guilty of misappropriating more than $7 billion from his bank and financial institutions to finance his personal business and lifestyle. During the six-week trial in 2012, Stanford was convicted on 13 of 14 counts of conspiracy, fraud, obstruction and money laundering. The jury also found that 29 financial accounts located abroad—worth approximately $330 million—were proceeds of Stanford's fraud and should be forfeited.

The Stanford trial was one of the largest financial fraud cases ever tried in federal court.

Sex Trafficking. In 2016, Hittner sentenced the organizer of a sex-trafficking ring that operated in Houston's East End to life in federal prison. Hortencia "Tencha" Medeles, then 70, was the leader of an international sex-trafficking ring that forced women, including minors, into prostitution. During the trial in 2015, jurors learned that Medeles owned a three-building complex in southeast Houston. Hidden doorways and staircases led from a downstairs cantina to a brothel upstairs where 17 rooms were rented out for sexual activities. Evidence presented in the case showed rooms were rented out 64,296 times during a 19-month period ending in 2013.

Sandra Bland. In 2016, Hittner granted the agreed dismissal of a wrongful death civil rights lawsuit filed by the family of Sandra Bland, an African-American woman who died in a Texas county jail days after a traffic violation and controversial arrest.  Her death was ruled a suicide. Following a judge-approved mediation, the lawyers representing Bland's family told Hittner that a legal settlement, $1.9 million, had resolved their claims.

Professional and academic recognition 

 State Bar of Texas' Presidents' Award as the Outstanding Lawyer in Texas (1984).
 Life Fellow of the Texas Bar Foundation and recipient of the Lola Wright Foundation Award for the Enhancement of Legal Ethics (1985).
 Association of Civil Trial and Appellate Specialists' Civil Judge of the Year (1988).
 American College of Trial Lawyers' Samuel E. Gates Award recognizing improvement of the U.S. litigation process (1989).
 Houston Press Criminal Judge of the Year (1999).
 Order of the Coif (honorary), the highest academic recognition for American law school graduates (2001).
 Texas Bar Foundation's Outstanding 50-Year Lawyer Award (2015).

Publications and lectures 

 "Summary Judgments in Texas: State and Federal Practice," 11 recurring law review articles 1981 to 2019.
 "Federal Civil Procedure Before Trial – Fifth Circuit," a three-volume treatise, first published in 1991 and updated annually.
 Contributing author to the State Bar of Texas' "Texas Civil Trial Handbook," 1985.
 Contributing author to the State Bar of Texas' "Texas Collections Manual," first and second editions, 1987.
 Contributing author to the 15-volume treatise, "Business and Commercial Litigation in Federal Courts," first, second, third and fourth editions; initially published in 1998 and updated annually.
 Creator of "Saturday Morning in Court," a continuing legal education lecture series, presented nationwide, 1981 to 2007. 
 Law school and college lecturer at schools throughout the country, including Harvard Law School, the University of Texas School of Law, Tulane Law School, South Texas College of Law Houston, and the U.S. Military Academy at West Point.

Personal life, memberships and interests 

Hittner has three adult children and four grandchildren.

He is a Master Mason, a member of the Scottish Rite of Freemasonry and the Shriners – embracing a family tradition that included his father and later his son. Masonic honors include the Thirty-Third Degree (1991); the Sam Houston Medal, the highest recognition of the Grand Lodge of Texas (2004); and the Thirty-Third Degree with Grand Cross  – the rarest honor in Masonry (2019).

Hittner became a Cub Scout in 1947 and has maintained his membership in the Boy Scouts of America throughout adulthood. He has been a scoutmaster and for more than 40 years he has served as a member of both the Sam Houston Area Council Board of Directors and the National Jewish Committee on Scouting. He has been a voting delegate on the National Council of the Boy Scouts of America. His adult recognitions include the Silver Beaver Award (1974), the Silver Antelope Award (1988) and the Distinguished Eagle Scout Award (1989).

Among Hittner's other activities outside the courtroom:

He is a member of the American Legion,  the Association of the United States Army and the 82nd Airborne Division Association.

Prior to his military service, he was a competitive flatwater canoeist and later served as a regional officer of the American Canoe Association.

He is the founder of the Brooklyn Dodgers Fan Club of Houston. Besides meeting Dodgers great Jackie Robinson, Hittner has met six U.S. presidents.

Since 1985, Hittner has played acoustic 12-string and electric bass guitars in the Texas Barflies, a country-western band.

References

External links
 ·   
"Judge Sentences AWOL Juror to 10 Days," by Harvey Rice, Houston Chronicle, April 26, 2005. https://www.chron.com/news/houston-texas/article/Judge-sentences-AWOL-juror-to-10-days-1940530.php  Retrieved April 22, 2020.
"Judicial Profile," by Marilynne Gorham, Federal Bar Association, July 2006. https://www.fedbar.org/wp-content/uploads/2019/10/HittnerJuly2006_3-pgs-pdf-3.pdf                                                                                                                                                            Retrieved April 22, 2020. 
"Houston Judge Presides Over Wedding Court as Former U.S. Attorney, Teacher Marry," by Gabrielle Banks, Houston Chronicle, January 30, 2020.  https://www.houstonchronicle.com/news/houston-texas/houston/article/Houston-judge-presides-over-wedding-court-as-15015344.php   Retrieved April 22, 2020.
"Judge David Hittner: All in the Family," by Lynne Liberato, HaynesBoone.com, December 31, 2005.  https://www.haynesboone.com/publications/judge-david-hittner-all-in-the-family                                                                                                                                          Retrieved April 22, 2020.
"Treasure Hunter Who Tried to Google Gold Loses Bid," by Mary Flood, Houston Chronicle, April 27, 2009. https://www.chron.com/news/houston-texas/article/Treasure-hunter-who-tried-to-Google-gold-loses-bid-1748948.php                                                         Retrieved April 22, 2020.
"Profile: Judge David Hittner – Federal Jurist Sets Different Bar for Himself," by Alan Bernstein, Houston Chronicle, October 19, 2003. No electronic link available.

1939 births
Living people
Judges of the United States District Court for the Southern District of Texas
New York University School of Law alumni
United States district court judges appointed by Ronald Reagan
20th-century American judges
United States Army officers
21st-century American judges
People from Schenectady, New York
New York University alumni
Texas lawyers